Himalayan Silver Fir forests is a plant community and conifer forest habitat type in the Western Himalayan subalpine conifer forests ecoregion of the Temperate coniferous forests Biome.

The forest's vegetation is dominated by the Abies pindrow (Himalayan Silver Fir) species of conifer trees.

Geography
It is located in the Western Himalayas region of the Himalayan Range System in southern Asia.

Himalayan Silver Fir Forests are found from  the Gandak River region in Nepal, through the higher elevations of northwestern India, to montane northern Pakistan.

See also
 
 
  — worldwide.
 Abies alba (European Silver Fir)

References
 

Himalayan forests

Forests of India
Forests of Pakistan
Temperate coniferous forests
Western Himalayan subalpine conifer forests